Jamo can refer to:

Hangul consonant and vowel tables, the consonants and vowels, known as jamo, of the Korean alphabet;
List of Hangul jamo
Hangul Jamo (Unicode block);
Jamo (company), a Danish loudspeaker manufacturer.
Jamo, Uttar Pradesh, a village in Amethi district of Uttar Pradesh, India